Samuel Cole (December 15, 1856 – July 6, 1935) was an American politician who served as Mayor of Beverly, Massachusetts and was a member of the Massachusetts General Court and the Massachusetts Governor's Council.

Early life
Cole was born on December 15, 1856 in Rutland, Vermont. His family moved to Beverly during his youth. Outside of politics, Cole worked as a market gardner.

Political career
From 1882 to 1894 Cole was a member of the Beverly School Committee. From 1895 to 1896 he served as president of the city's common council. From 1897 to 1899 he was a member of the Massachusetts House of Representatives. From 1901 to 1902 he was Mayor of Beverly. From 1903 to 1904 he represented the Second Essex District in the Massachusetts Senate. From 1908 to 1909 he represented the 5th District on the Massachusetts Governor's Council.

Death
Cole died on July 6, 1935.

References

1856 births
1935 deaths
Republican Party Massachusetts state senators
Mayors of Beverly, Massachusetts
Members of the Massachusetts Governor's Council
Republican Party members of the Massachusetts House of Representatives
People from Rutland (town), Vermont